Jennifer "Jen" Wilson (born 27 March 1979) is the head coach for Scotland. She is a former South Africa international field hockey player.

She was appointed Head Coach for Scotland on a 3 year contract, starting on 1 August 2018.

Playing career
Wilson competed for South Africa at three Olympic Games: the 2004, 2008 and 2012 Summer Olympics. She also competed at three Hockey World Cups and three Commonwealth Games.

Coaching career
In 2015 to 2017 she was assistant coach for Scotland.

She has previously been Head Coach for Ashford Hockey Club Men’s 1st XI in the Kent/Sussex and South Premier League and later for Canterbury 1st XI in the Investec Women's Hockey League Premier Division and in the EuroHockey Club Champions Cup (women).

In Season 2019/20 Wilson is Head Coach for Sevenoaks 1st XI in the Investec Women's Hockey League Division One South, in addition to her part-time role as Head Coach for Scotland.

References

External links 
 

1979 births
Living people
Sportspeople from Harare
South African people of British descent
Olympic field hockey players of South Africa
South African female field hockey players
Field hockey players at the 2012 Summer Olympics
Field hockey players at the 2002 Commonwealth Games
Field hockey players at the 2006 Commonwealth Games
Field hockey players at the 2010 Commonwealth Games
Commonwealth Games competitors for South Africa
Place of birth missing (living people)
South African expatriate sportspeople in Scotland
South African field hockey coaches
South African expatriate sportspeople in England